Around the Sun: An Episodic Audio Drama is a scripted podcast series. Each anthology episode pairs two characters in a short scene that addresses a specific social issue. Production began during the COVID-19 pandemic in the United States.

Production 
Around the Sun is written and produced by Brad Forenza. The first season was co-produced by Suzanne Ordas Curry and Brian Dashew, and launched via the Broadway Podcast Network in October 2021. An audio-video episode was also produced as part of the season. In September, 2022, Forenza and Adassa announced on NPR Illinois that a second season would premiere that autumn.

Season 1 (2021-22) 
Season 1 premiered on October 21, 2021 via the Broadway Podcast Network, with episodes taking place throughout New York City.

Season 2 (2022-23) 
Season 2 premiered on October 26, 2022 via the Broadway Podcast Network. The season featured a new cast, with episodes unfolding in and around the American Southwest.

References

External links

Broadway Podcast Network

Audio podcasts
Scripted podcasts
2021 podcast debuts
American podcasts